Over the Hill is a 1917 American silent drama film directed by William Parke and starring Gladys Hulette, J.H. Gilmour and Dan Mason.

Cast
 Gladys Hulette as Esther 
 J.H. Gilmour as Amos Winthrop 
 Dan Mason as Reverend Timothy Neal 
 William Parke Jr. as Roy Winthrop 
 Chester Barnett as Allen Stone 
 Richard Thornton as Jim Barnes 
 Joyce Fair as Rose Lawlor 
 Paul Clerget as Mr. Lawlor 
 Tula Belle as Rose's Sister 
 Inda Palmer as Mrs. Finn 
 John Carr as Mike 
 Billy Sullivan as King Arthur

References

Bibliography
 Langman, Larry. The Media in the Movies: A Catalog of American Journalism Films, 1900-1996. McFarland & Company, 1998.

External links

1917 films
1917 drama films
Silent American drama films
Films directed by William Parke
American silent feature films
1910s English-language films
Pathé Exchange films
American black-and-white films
Films about journalism
1910s American films